Wright-Martin Aircraft Corporation was a short-lived aircraft manufacturing business venture between the Wright Company (after Orville Wright sold the Wright Company and divested himself from it) and Glenn L. Martin.

History
Company officials merged their respective organizations, the Wright Company and the Glenn L. Martin Company, in 1916.

The company continued and escalated the Wright brothers patent war with other aircraft manufacturers, until its resolution—under duress from the government, in 1917, at the start of U.S. involvement in World War I—by the cross-licensing agreement developed and managed through the Manufacturers Aircraft Association.

A license-built version of the Hispano-Suiza 8 was manufactured by the company under the engineering leadership of Henry M. Crane. It was used by Vought VE-7, VE-8, Boeing NB-2, and Loening M-8.

By 1918, the company had a factory in Long Island City, New York.

Martin soon resigned, dissolving the Wright-Martin joint enterprise within a year. The company was renamed Wright Aeronautical in 1919, and shifted from manufacturing aircraft to manufacturing aircraft engines, developing the pivotal Wright Whirlwind engines which changed aviation dramatically.

Glenn Martin continued development of his Glenn L. Martin Company, which remained a major aircraft manufacturer until the 1950s and early 1960s when it also began developing rockets, missiles, and spacecraft. In 1961 the company merged with the American-Marietta Corporation to become industrial conglomerate (and continued aerospace manufacturer) Martin-Marietta which, in 1995, merged with Lockheed to become today's Lockheed-Martin, one of the United States' three remaining major large aircraft manufacturers (along with Boeing and Northrop-Grumman).

Aircraft

References

External links

 World War I advertisement for the Wright-Martin Aircraft Corporation - FIGHT or Join the Industrial Aircraft Service, Popular Science monthly, December 1918, page 91.

Defunct aircraft manufacturers of the United States
.
Wright brothers
Defunct aircraft engine manufacturers of the United States
American companies established in 1916
Vehicle manufacturing companies established in 1916
Manufacturing companies disestablished in 1919
American companies disestablished in 1919